Pagnani is an Italian surname. Notable people with the surname include:

Andreina Pagnani (1906–1981), Italian actress and voice actress
Gino Pagnani (1927–2010), Italian actor and voice actor
Lola Pagnani (born 1972), Italian actress

See also
Pagani (surname)

Italian-language surnames